The Battle of Arpachai was a battle on 18 June 1807 on the Akhurian River in Armenia during the Russo-Turkish War (1806–1812). It was fought between a 7,000-man Russian force under Count Ivan Gudovich and more than 20,000 Ottoman force under Yusuf Pasha. The offensive was repelled by the Russian forces.

References

External links
www.napoleon-series.org

Arpachai
Arpachai
Arpachai
1807 in the Ottoman Empire
19th century in Armenia
1807 in the Russian Empire
June 1807 events